Firecrest can refer to:

Birds
 Common firecrest (often called firecrest), Regulus ignicapillus, found in Europe and north Africa
 Madeira firecrest, Regulus madeirensis, found on the island of Madeira
 Taiwan firecrest (also known as flamecrest), Regulus goodfellowi, found in Taiwan

Ships and boats
 USS Firecrest, a ship name used more than once by the U.S. Navy
 Firecrest, was a 12-ton racing cruiser in which Alain Gerbault circumnavigated the globe from 1923 to 1929

Aircraft
 Blackburn Firecrest, was a single-engine naval strike fighter aeroplane built by Blackburn Aircraft

Other
 Firecrest (novel), a 1971 thriller novel by Victor Canning

Animal common name disambiguation pages